Jiaotong University, Jiao Tong University, or Chiao Tung University may refer to:

 Beijing Jiaotong University in Haidian, Beijing
 National Yang Ming Chiao Tung University in Hsinchu and Taipei, Taiwan
 Shanghai Jiao Tong University in Shanghai
 Southwest Jiaotong University in Chengdu, Sichuan
 Xi'an Jiaotong University in Xi'an, Shaanxi

Jiaotong/Chiao Tung may be translated as transportation or communication but it also means "extending in all directions." Engineering and managerial sciences are prioritized academic focus, not the exclusive fields of research in the Jiaotong/Chiao Tung universities.

There are now also other universities named Jiaotong University which do not have the same origin as the above five Jiaotong universities, including:
 Chongqing Jiaotong University in Chongqing
 Dalian Jiaotong University in Dalian, Liaoning
 East China Jiaotong University in Nanchang, Jiangxi
 Lanzhou Jiaotong University in Lanzhou, Gansu

History 
Chiao Tung University was created by the Ministry of Chiao Tung, Republic of China.

1956–2021
 National Chiao Tung University (Hsinchu, Taiwan) (re-established in 1956 as National Chiao Tung University in ROC after retreating from mainland China in 1949. Merged with National Yang Ming University in 2021.)
 After the Kuomintang were defeated in 1949, a part of the faculty retreated to Taiwan with Chiang Kai-shek and, in 1958, formed the eponymous National Chiao Tung University in Taiwan.  The institution that remained in Shanghai was renamed Chiao Tung University to reflect the fact that all universities under the new socialist state would be public.  In the 1950s, the pinyin romanization system was developed in Mainland China and Chiao Tung University changed its English name to Jiao Tong University.
 The national strategy adopted in 1956 dictated that the majority of Jiao Tong University would be moved to Xi'an, Shaanxi(). During the movement, the national strategy was changed and there were questions on necessity of the move. Since the majority of the facilities, staffs, faculties and students had already arrived in Xi'an and the campus had started operated, the university decided to operate two campuses, one in Xi'an and another in Shanghai. However, the operation with two campuses were difficult and moving the Xi'an campus back to Shanghai was impossible. Thus, from July 31, 1959, with the approval from State Council of the People's Republic of China, two campuses became independent. The Xi'an campus changed its name to Xi'an Jiaotong University and the Shanghai campus changed its name to Shanghai Jiao Tong University. Xi'an Jiaotong University was immediately listed as a National Key University. Later, it became one of a handful of universities built according to the "Seventh Five-Year Plan" and "Eighth Five-Year Plan." In 2000, the State Council approved a merger of Xi'an Medical University and the Shaanxi Institute of Finance and Economics into Xi'an Jiaotong University.

2021-present
 National Yang Ming Chiao Tung University (Hsinchu, Taiwan and Taipei, Taiwan) (result of the merger of National Chiao Tung University in Hsinchu and National Yang Ming University in Taipei.)

1952–present
 Beijing Jiaotong University (1952–1970, Beijing Railway Institute. 1970–2003, Northern Jiaotong University. 2003–present, Beijing Jiaotong University.) (Beijing) 
 Southwest Jiaotong University (1952–1972, Tangshan Railway Institute. 1972–present, Southwest Jiaotong University. 1972–1989, in Emei, Sichuan. In 1989, Chengdu campus constructed.)

1949–1952
 Northern Jiaotong University (PRC) (formed by merging Engineering Institute and Peiping Railway Management Institute of National Chiao Tung University. During 1949 and 1950 named China Chiao Tung University. In 1952 divided into Tangshan Railway Institute and Beijing Railway Institute.)

1959–present
 Sian Chiaotung University (Xian Jiaotong University)
 Shanghai Chiaotung University (Shanghai Jiao Tong University)

1956–1959
 Chiao Tung University (Sian Part, Shanghai Part)
1949–1956
 Chiao Tung University (Shanghai) (PRC)

1928–1949
 National Chiao Tung University, Shanghai. (ROC. During the Anti-Japanese War moved to Chungking.)
 Tangshan (Civil) Engineering Institute, National Chiao Tung University, Tangshan, Hebei. (ROC. During the Anti-Japanese War moved to  Hunan, Guizhou and then Sichuan.)
 Peiping Railway Management Institute, National Chiao Tung University, Peiping. (ROC. During the Anti-Japanese War moved to Hunan, Guizhou and then Sichuan.)

1927–1928
 Shanghai Chiao Tung University / First Chiao Tung University, Shanghai. (In 1927 Nanyang University renamed Shanghai Chiao Tung University and in 1928 renamed the First Chiao Tung University)
 Tangshan Chiao Tung University / Second Chiao Tung University, Tangshan. (In 1928, Tangshan University renamed Tangshan Chiao Tung University and then renamed the Second Chiao Tung University)
 Peiping Chiao Tung University / Third Chiao Tung University, Peiping. (In 1928, Peiping Chiao Tung University renamed the Third Chiao Tung University)

1921–1922
 Chiao Tung University (Shanghai, Tangshan, Peking). (In 1922, Chiao Tung University Shanghai School renamed Nanyang University, and Tangshan School renamed Tangshan University. In 1923, Peking School renamed Peking Chiao Tung University.)

See also
Transport University (disambiguation)